George Edward Boothman (September 25, 1916 – September 13, 2003) was a Canadian professional ice hockey centre. He played 58 regular season and 5 playoff games for the Toronto Maple Leafs of the National Hockey League (NHL) between 1942 and 1944. The rest of his career, which lasted from 1938 to 1950, was spent in various minor leagues.

Career statistics

Regular season and playoffs

External links
 

1916 births
2003 deaths
Buffalo Bisons (AHL) players
Canadian ice hockey centres
Dallas Texans (USHL) players
Milwaukee Clarks players
New Haven Eagles players
Providence Reds players
San Diego Skyhawks players
Ice hockey people from Calgary
Toronto Maple Leafs players